Beitar Jerusalem are an Israeli football club based in Jerusalem. The 2020–21 season will be the clubs 84th competitive campaign since the club were formed. During this season the club will have competed in the following competitions: Israeli Premier League, Toto Cup Al, UEFA Europa League, State Cup.

Players

Current squad

On loan

Transfers

In

Out

Competitions

Overview

Israeli Premier League

League table

Results summary

Results by round

Matches

Toto Cup

Group C

Ranking of first-placed teams

Classification play-offs

UEFA Europa League

Europa League qualifying phase

State Cup

References

External links

  Official website
 UEFA Profile
 בית"ר.נט – אתר האוהדים של בית"ר י-ם (fans website)
 Betexplorer
 Soccerway
 World Football

Beitar Jerusalem F.C. seasons
Beitar Jerusalem